Hamish & Andy is a weekly podcast hosted by Australian comedy duo Hamish & Andy, with Jack Post joining Blake and Lee as a co-host. The first episode was released on 1 March 2018 after the duo's retirement from live radio broadcasting in 2017. In a format similar to that of their previous radio shows of the same name, each episode runs for about 45 minutes with four to five segments. As of 2023, the podcast has run for five seasons, with 40 episodes published annually.

The show has consistently rated as one of Australia's most downloaded programmes, and it has been the number-one comedy podcast in the country for five years straight as of the end of 2022.

Background 
In 2016, the duo announced that 2017 would be their final year on radio. Their final radio show was broadcast live from Margaret Court Arena on 1 December 2017 for their Coolboys and the Frontman Private Jet Tour. Their final radio episodes from 2017 received an estimated 30 million podcast downloads.

In 2018, Hamish & Andy announced they would be returning with a weekly podcast on 1 March.

Release 
Annually, 40 episodes are released every Thursday. Typically from early December to late February, the podcast goes on hiatus, with the duo jokingly referring to the break as "government mandated". Episodes are released on major podcast platforms as well as Southern Cross Austereo's online platform Listnr.

In 2022, Hamish & Andy announced a partnership with Apple Podcasts, granting access to a complete archive of all the duo's radio shows since 2006 via a monthly subscription.

Season overview

Notable activities 
In October 2019, Hamish & Andy organised Chicken Fest, an international invitation to listeners to dress up in black tie garb and visit their favourite local chicken shop. The event, held on 21 October, culminated in thousands of listeners turning up to restaurants around Australia.

In August 2020, the duo released the Hamish & Andy Loyalty Card, with the promise of being accepted at every store worldwide and giving 10% off the cardholder's purchase, with 5% of that cut immediately going back to the store. 30,000 cards were produced and sent to listeners who signed up at their website.

In October 2020, Hamish & Andy released a limited-edition illustrated coffee table book featuring over 100 "power moves" from the eponymous segment where listeners submit activities to assert dominance over each other. A total of 30,000 copies were produced in its first run. A second edition of the book was released in October 2021.

On 1 December 2022, as part of the season five finale, the duo, along with 61 listeners, gathered in a Rex Boeing 737 at Melbourne Airport for an "Emergency Slide Party", which involved everyone casually descending down the plane's evacuation slide. The event had originally been planned in 2020, but it was delayed numerous times due to the COVID-19 pandemic.

Remembering Project (2020–present) 
In October 2020, a spin-off podcast was launched titled Hamish & Andy's Remembering Project. Each episode, the duo are given a random date by Radio Mike to discuss all their previous radio shows that were conducted on that day. Either Blake or Lee picks a segment from a chosen year, and, if they conclude on a good one to talk about, they play it in full.

As of December 2022, 64 episodes of the Remembering Project have been published. Episodes from seasons 3 and 4 were originally exclusive to the Listnr app, but have since been added to other major podcast platforms.

Season overview

References 

2018 podcast debuts
Australian podcasts
Hamish & Andy
Comedy and humor podcasts